Eledone is a genus of octopuses forming the only genus in the family Eledonidae. It is mainly distributed in the northern and southern Atlantic Ocean, with one species, E. palari, described from the southwestern Pacific Ocean and eastern Indian Ocean in waters around Indonesia and Australia and another, E. microsicya, from the western Indian Ocean.  One species, E. thysanophora, is now regarded as a synonym of the brush-tipped octopus (Eledone schultzei).

Species
The following species are currently classified as being in the genus Eledone:

 Eledone caparti Adam, 1950 
 Eledone cirrhosa (Lamarck, 1798) – curled octopus
 Eledone gaucha Haimovici, 1988 
 Eledone massyae Voss, 1964 – combed octopus
 Eledone microsicya * (Rochebrune, 1884) 
 Eledone moschata (Lamarck, 1798) – musky octopus
 Eledone nigra (Hoyle, 1910)
 Eledone palari Lu and Stranks, 1992 – spongetip octopus
 Eledone schultzei Hoyle, 1910 -- brush-tipped octopus

The species listed above with an asterisk (*) are questionable and need further study to determine if they are valid species or synonyms.

References

External links

 

 
Cephalopod genera